The Chiappa Double Badger is an Italian made over and under combination gun manufactured by Chiappa Firearms. It comes in four versions a .22 LR over .410 bore, a .22 WMR over .410 bore a .22 LR over 20 gauge and a .243 Winchester over .410 bore. It's marketed as "a great choice for hunting, survival or fun recreational shooting".

Design 
The Double Badger is a standard wooden stock combination gun that "has the look, feel and function of an over and under shotgun". It comes in four versions a .22 LR over .410 bore, a .22 WMR over .410 bore a .22 LR over 20 gauge and a .243 Winchester over .410 bore. It is 5.8 pounds, has 19 inch barrels and an overall length of 36 inches. It has double triggers, with the front trigger firing the lower shotgun barrel and the back trigger firing the upper rimfire barrel. It uses a lever-action that both cocks the internal hammers and open the action. It has a tang safety located at the top rear (or "tang") of the receiver. It comes with Williams Fiber Optic Ghost ring sights and a 3/8” dovetail rail for mounting optics. It can be folded in half to 21.2 inches in length for ease of stowage.

The 20 gauge barrels are threaded and will accept standard Remington Choke tubes. It comes with a modified choke.

See also 
Chiappa Little Badger
Chiappa M6 Survival Gun
Chiappa Triple Crown
Savage Model 24

References

External links 
 YouTube video...Chiappa Double Badger Table Top Unboxing
 YouTube video...Chiappa Double Badger - Combination Gun Review
 REVIEW: Chiappa Double Badger Folding .22 Magnum/410 Shotgun
 LONG TERM UPDATE: Chiappa Double Badger Folding .22 Magnum/410 Shotgun
 Official website

.22 LR firearms
Chiappa Firearms
Combination guns
Multiple-barrel firearms
Rifles of Italy
Shotguns of Italy
Survival guns